Puthri is a 1966 Indian Malayalam-language film,  directed and produced by P. Subramaniam. The film stars Madhu, Thikkurissy Sukumaran Nair, Babu Joseph and Aranmula Ponnamma. The film had musical score by M. B. Sreenivasan.

Cast
Madhu
K. V. Shanthi
Thikkurissy Sukumaran Nair
Aranmula Ponnamma
G. K. Pillai
Babu Joseph
Jyothikumar
Pankajavalli
S. P. Pillai
Sarasamma

Soundtrack
The music was composed by M. B. Sreenivasan and the lyrics were written by O. N. V. Kurup.

References

External links
 

1966 films
1960s Malayalam-language films
Films directed by P. Subramaniam